Webmonkey was an online tutorial website composed of various articles on building webpages from backend to frontend. The site covered many aspects of developing on the web like programming, database, multimedia, and setting up web storefronts. The content presented was much like Wired magazine but for learning to design web content. Webmonkey had content applicable to both advanced users and newer internet users interested in the underlying technologies of the web.

History
Webmonkey was launched in August 1996.

In 1999, Webmonkey introduced Webmonkey Kids, a web design tutorial site for children.

Webmonkey was shut down in February 2004 following a round of layoffs in the U.S. division of its parent company, Lycos. It was reopened in February 2006, and mothballed again later in 2006.

In May 2008, Webmonkey was acquired by Condé Nast Publications, the company that publishes Wired magazine. It was temporarily relaunched as a wiki, but reconverted due to spam issues. Instead, the Webmonkey website was regularly updated with new articles by Scott Gilbertson until May 2013, when it was decided to stop producing content for it. The webmonkey URL was redirected to wired.com.

References

External links
 Archived homepage 

Condé Nast websites